The 2008–2014 Spanish financial crisis, also known as the Great Recession in Spain or the Great Spanish Depression, began in 2008 during the world financial crisis of 2007–08. In 2012, it made Spain a late participant in the European sovereign debt crisis when the country was unable to bail out its financial sector and had to apply for a €100 billion rescue package provided by the European Stability Mechanism (ESM).

The main cause of Spain's crisis was the housing bubble and the accompanying unsustainably high GDP growth rate.  The ballooning tax revenues from the booming property investment and construction sectors kept the Spanish government's revenue in surplus, despite strong increases in expenditure, until 2007. The Spanish government supported the critical development by relaxing supervision of the financial sector and thereby allowing the banks to violate International Accounting Standards Board standards.. The banks in Spain were able to hide losses and earnings volatility, mislead regulators, analysts, and investors, and thereby finance the Spanish real estate bubble. The results of the crisis were devastating for Spain, including a strong economic downturn, a severe increase in unemployment, and bankruptcies of major companies.

Even though some fundamental problems in the Spanish economy were already evident far ahead of the crisis, Spain continued the path of unsustainable property led growth when the ruling party changed in 2004. In these early times Spain had already a huge trade deficit, a loss of competitiveness against its main trading partners, an above-average inflation rate, house price increases, and a growing family indebtedness. During the third quarter of 2008 the national GDP contracted for the first time in 15 years, and, in February 2009, Spain (and other European economies) officially entered recession. The economy contracted 3.7% in 2009 and again in 2010 by 0.1%. It grew by 0.7% in 2011. By the 1st quarter of 2012, Spain was officially in recession once again. The Spanish government forecast a 1.7% drop for 2012.

The provision of up to €100 billion of rescue loans from eurozone funds was agreed by eurozone finance ministers on 9 June 2012. As of October 2012, the so-called Troika (European Commission, ECB and IMF) was in negotiations with Spain to establish an economic recovery program required for providing additional financial loans from the European Stability Mechanism (ESM). In addition to applying for a €100 billion bank recapitalization package in June 2012, Spain negotiated financial support from a "Precautionary Conditioned Credit Line" (PCCL) package. If Spain applied and received a PCCL package, irrespective to what extent it subsequently decided to draw on this established credit line, this would at the same time immediately qualify the country to receive "free" additional financial support from the European Central Bank (ECB), in the form of some unlimited yield-lowering bond purchases.

The turning point for the Spanish sovereign debt crisis occurred on 26 July 2012, when ECB President Mario Draghi said that the ECB was "ready to do whatever it takes to preserve the euro". Announced on 6 September 2012, the ECB's Outright Monetary Transactions (OMT) program of unlimited purchases of short-term sovereign debt put the ECB's balance sheet behind the pledge. Speculative runs against Spanish sovereign debt were discouraged and 10-year bond yields stayed below the 6% level, approaching the 5% level by the end of 2012.

Property bubble

The residential real estate bubble saw real estate prices rise 200% from 1996 to 2007.

€651 billion was the mortgage debt of Spanish families in the second quarter of 2005 (this debt continued to grow at 25% per year – 2001 through 2005, with 97% of mortgages at variable rate interest). In 2004, 509,293 new properties were built in Spain and in 2005 the number of new properties built was 528,754. In a country with 16.5 million families, there were 22–24 million houses and 3–4 million empty houses. From all the houses built over the 2001–2007 period, "no less than 28%" were vacant as of late 2008.

House ownership in Spain is above 80%. The desire to own one's own home was encouraged by governments in the 60s and 70s, and has thus become part of the Spanish psyche. In addition, tax regulation encourages ownership: 15% of mortgage payments are deductible from personal income taxes. Even more, the oldest apartments are controlled by non-inflation-adjusted rent-controls and eviction is slow, therefore discouraging renting.

When the speculative bubble popped Spain became one of the worst affected countries. According to Eurostat, between June 2007 and June 2008, Spain has been the European country with the sharpest plunge in construction, with actual sales down an average 25.3%. So far, some regions have been more affected than others (Catalonia was ahead in this regard with a 42.2% sales plunge while sparsely populated regions like Extremadura were down a mere 1.7% over the same period).

Banks offered 40-year mortgages and, more recently, 50-year mortgages. While some observers suggest that a soft landing will occur, others suggest that a crash in prices is probable. Lower home prices will allow low-income families and young people to enter the market; however, there is a strong perception that house prices never go down. As of August 2008, while new constructions have come virtually to a halt, prices have not had significant movements, neither up nor downwards. The national average price as of late 2008 is 2,095 euros/m2.

Housing prices
were projected to fall another 25%. Government protections allow banks to avoid marking-to-market to postpone losses. "Spanish housing prices are now falling at the fastest pace on record" dropping 15.2% over the last year. Mortgage holders must continue to pay the debt even after a foreclosure. Banks have begun to accept "deed-in-lieu deals" in which the debt is cancelled if the property is surrendered, allowing the bank to quickly sell and recoup a greater percentage of the loan or turn the property into a rental.

Some developments resemble ghost towns. For instance, the town of Valdeluz was constructed for 30,000 people, but had a population of only 700 people in 2011. Ghost airports such as €1.1 billion Ciudad Real Central Airport, Castellón-Costa Azahar Airport and others were built.

Prices
Due to the lack of its own resources, Spain has to import all of its fossil fuels, which in a scenario of record prices added much pressure to the inflation rate. Thus, in June 2008 the inflation rate reached a 13-year high of 5.00%. Then, with the dramatic decrease of oil prices that happened in the second half of 2008 plus the confirmed burst of the property bubble, concerns quickly shifted to the risk of deflation instead, as Spain registered in January 2009 its lowest inflation rate in 40 years which was then followed in March 2009 by a negative inflation rate for the first time ever since this statistic was recorded.

As of October 2010, the Spanish economy continued to contract, resulting in decreasing GDP and increasing inflation.  From 2011 to 2012 alone, prices rose 3.5% as compared to 2% in the United States. The rise in prices, combined with the recently implemented austerity measures and extremely high unemployment, are heavily impacting the livelihood of Spanish citizens.  As the average wage decreases, the buying power of the money decreases as well. The frustration of this decreases in buying power has manifested in several, very large, worker demonstrations.

Spanish banking system

The Spanish banking system had been credited as one of the most solid and best equipped among all Western economies to cope with the worldwide liquidity crisis, thanks to the country's conservative banking rules and practices. Banks are required to have high capital provisions and demand various proofs and securities from intending borrowers. Nevertheless, this practice was greatly relaxed during the housing bubble, a trend to which the regulator (Banco de España) turned a blind eye.

Spain's unusual accounting standards, intended to smooth earnings over the business cycle, have misled regulators and analysts by hiding losses and earnings volatility. The accounting technique of "dynamic provisioning", which violated the standards set by the International Accounting Standards Board, obscured capital cushions until they were depleted, allowing the appearance of health as problems mounted.

It was later revealed that nearly all the Spanish representatives in Congress had large investments in the housing sector, some owning up to twenty houses. Over time, more and more news has emerged about the informal alliance between Spanish central and regional governments, the banking sector (bear in mind for example the recent government pardon of the second in command at the Santander Bank, while all the major parties are strongly indebted with banks, and such debts are extended from time to time) which increased the bubble size over the years. Most regional semi-public savings banks (cajas) lent heavily to real estate companies that at the end of the bubble went bankrupt, then the cajas found themselves left with the collateral and properties of those companies, namely overpriced real state and residential-zoned land, now worthless, rendering the cajas in essence bankrupt.

In stark contrast to countries like Ireland, no nationalization took place. Instead the problem was rolled-over with the extension of the remaining real estate companies debts, while the central government bailed once and again banks and cajas alike. For more than three years, there has been a steady process of bank concentration.  Spain had the densest bank-office net in Europe, which led many bank employees to be dismissed. By contrast, the bank Board of Members have mostly kept their jobs, even those in merged entities. Golden parachutes have been prevalent: it has been speculated that this was because of fear that laid-off senior members would talk about the sector's rampant malpractice.  To this date no bankers have been legally charged for having roles in this process.

In May 2012 credit ratings of several Spanish banks were downgraded, some to "junk" status. The Bankia bank, the country's largest mortgage lender, was nationalized on 9 May, and on 25 May it announced that it would require a bailout of €23.5 billion to cover losses from failed mortgages.

In addition to Spanish banks, other European banks have a sizable presence in Spain. German banks lead with an exposure of $146 billion. Germany's Landesbanks "rushed in" during the early 2000s. Barclays, Deutsche Bank, and ING have large Spanish units.

On 9 June 2012 Eurozone finance ministers agreed that Spanish banks would be provided with up to €100 billion of rescue loans. This money is to be distributed via the Fund for Orderly Bank Restructuring, and that the exact amount to be loaned would be determined after audits of the banks. EC President Jose Manuel Barroso and vice-president Olli Rehn welcomed the move, praising the combination of a "thorough restructuring of the banking sector", structural reforms, and fiscal consolidation; U.S. Treasury Secretary Timothy Geithner also welcomed the move.

Recent bank stress tests will enable the Spanish government to make a formal request for the €100 billion credit line. Further analysis and tests will be undertaken prior to restructuring and recapitalization over the next year. Restrictions on the credit line exempting funds from covering "legacy assets" suggests limits to the planned banking bailouts.

In May 2012, Spanish banks lent €1.66 trillion to the private sector and took in €896 billion. Historically it would borrow the difference from foreign banks (i.e., interbank lending) but reduced access has led to a greater reliance on ECB loans. Spanish banks borrowed a record €376 billion (net) from the ECB in July 2012. Depositors are fleeing Spanish banks; deposits have dropped 4.7% from June to July (2012) as money is moved abroad.

On 28 November 2012, the European Commission approved the Spanish government's plan to shrink and restructure three major Spanish banks—Bankia, NCG Banco, and Catalunya Banc—and sell a fourth, Banco de Valencia. This is part of a €37 billion EC bailout or restructuring approved in June. It includes loss-taking by investors of up to €10 billion, the creation of a "bad bank" to absorb up to €45 billion of failed loans, closing thousands of bank branches, and reducing staff.

Employment crisis
After having completed substantial improvements over the second half of the 1990s and during the 2000s, which put a few regions on the brink of full employment, Spain suffered a severe setback in October 2008, when it saw its unemployment rate surging to 1996 levels. Between October 2007 and October 2008, Spain had its unemployment rate climb 36%, exceeding by far the unemployment surge of past economic crises like 1993. In particular, in October 2008, Spain suffered its worst unemployment rise ever recorded and, the country has suffered Europe's biggest unemployment crisis during the 2008 crisis.

Spain's unemployment rate hit 17.4% at the end of March 2009, with the jobless total now having doubled over the past 12 months, when two million people lost their jobs. In this same month, Spain had over 4 million people unemployed, By July 2009, it had shed 1.2 million jobs in one year and was to have the same number of jobless as France and Italy combined. By March 2012, Spain's unemployment rate reached 24.4%, twice the eurozone average.

In 2012, unions organized a general strike to protest proposals to weaken union power, enable cuts in wages, and lower firing costs.

By the end of 2012, Spain's unit labor costs improved. It narrowed the gap with Germany by 5.5% and 4.6% with respect to France. Spain's policy of internal devaluation cut public sector salaries by 5% with an additional 7.1% cut consisting of a suspension of the "14-month bonus".

Spain, as in other southern European nations, relies heavily on the inter-generational family structure for a significant portion of the social safety net. Employment expectations should be adjusted for this cultural ethos. The unemployment rate for the "principal breadwinner" is 12.4% less than the 25% overall rate (June 2012.) Employment is also found in the underground economy, which is estimated to be as large as 20% of the economy during the boom years.

{|class=wikitable
|+Unemployment rate (INE)
|- align="center"
! Legislature !! Period !! Total unemployment !! Annual change
|- align="center"
| rowspan=4|8th (Zapatero)
| 2005 Q1 || 10.17% || −11.57%
|- align="center"
| 2006 Q1 || 9.03% || −11.20%
|- align="center"
| 2007 Q1 || 8.42% || −6.76% 
|- align="center"
| 2008 Q1 || 9.60% || 14.01%
|- align="center"
| rowspan=3|9th (Zapatero)
| 2009 Q1 || 17.24% || 79.58%
|- align="center"
| 2010 Q1 || 19.84% || 15.08%
|- align="center"
| 2011 Q1 || 21.08% || 6.25%
|- align="center"
| rowspan=5|10th (Rajoy)
| 2012 Q1 || 24.19% || 14.75%
|- align="center"
| 2013 Q1 || 26.94% || 11.37%
|- align="center"
| 2014 Q1 || 25.93% || −3.75%
|- align="center"
| 2015 Q1 || 23.78% || −8.29%
|- align="center"
| 2016 Q1 || 21.00% || −11.69%
|}

Youth unemployment

Unemployment for those under 25 has been reported to be 50%. Spain's current generation is considered the most educated that the country has ever had, yet it faces the greatest rate of unemployment in Europe. Roughly 68% of young people are willing to leave the country to search for a job, and those with college degrees are willing to settle for working at so-called minijobs for a paycheck. The State Secretary for Unemployment states that higher education is a way for the current generation to battle this issue; however, government cuts are occurring that slash university staff salaries and increase the number of students per class. For those paying their own way through college, the tough economy has made it nearly impossible to find a job and study simultaneously.  Hopes for the future are dwindling as Spain's unemployment rate is almost as high as it was for the United States during the Great Depression. People are beginning to fear the transformation of this generation into one referred to as a "Lost Generation" that is constantly looking for work and whose futures are closed off from "good careers". The stress of unemployment has also affected personal relationships, with many young adults separating from partners. Youth unemployment is about double overall unemployment.

The high unemployment rate, at 56% as of June 2013, is overstated. Subtracting students and young mothers not looking for jobs, the actual number is closer to 22%.

From immigration to emigration 

Large-scale immigration continued throughout 2008 despite severe unemployment, but by 2011 the OECD confirmed that the total number of people leaving the country (Spaniards and non-Spaniards) had over taken the number of arrivals. Spain is now a net emigrant country. There are now indications that established immigrants have begun to leave, although many that have are still retaining a household in Spain due to the poor conditions that exist in their country of origin.

Tourism
As the financial crisis was getting started in Spain, it was already underway in the United States and other western countries. The decrease in disposable income of consumers led to a sharp decrease in Spain's tourist industry, a rarity in a country with so many coastal towns. Indeed, the EU as a group saw a decline in tourists coming to their countries in 2008 and 2009, with −13% tourism growth in coastal Spain. Despite its traditional popularity with Korean and Japanese tourists, the relatively expensive cost of holidaying in Spain led many to pursue "sun and beach" Mediterranean getaways in Turkey, Spain's tourism rival.

However, Spain has also seen the largest growth in tourism since 2011 and 2012. Its geographic advantages, the Arab Spring, and other non-economic factors are contributing to its resurgence as a tourist destination. While Spain's economy itself is not doing well, purchasing power parity is generally rising again. Furthermore, violent unrest in North Africa and the Middle East is redirecting tourists towards stable countries like Spain.

Public debt  

Spain entered crisis period with a relatively modest public debt of 36.2% of GDP. This was largely due to ballooning tax revenue from the housing bubble, which helped accommodate a decade of increased government spending without debt accumulation. In response to the crisis, Spain initiated an austerity program consisting primarily of tax increases. Prime Minister Mariano Rajoy announced on 11 July 2012 €65 billion of austerity, including cuts in wages and benefits and a VAT increase from 18% to 21%. The government eventually succeeded to reduce its budget deficit from 11.2% of GDP in 2009 to 8.5% in 2011 and it is expected to fall further to 5.4% in 2012.

As of 15 June 2012, Spain's public debt stood at 72.1% of GDP, still less than the Euro-zone average of 88%. If Spain uses the €100 billion credit line to bail out its banks, its debt will approach 90% of GDP. To avoid this, the EU has pledged to lend to banks directly although it now appears that the Spanish government may have to guarantee the loans.

In June 2012, the Spanish 10-year government bond reached 7%, 5.44% over the German 10-year bond. As Spanish credit default swaps (CDS) hits a record high of 633 basis points and the 10-year bond yield at 7.5% (23 July 2012) Spain's economic minister travels to Germany to request that the ECB facilitate government bond purchases to "avoid an imminent financial collapse". Promised borrowing by the ECB has enabled Spain's 10-year yield to stay below or close to the 6% level and settling below the 5% level in the spring of 2013.

In 2016, public debt reached 101% of GDP.

Ratings
For the third time in 13 months, Moody's Investors Service has cut Spain's rating. On 18 October 2011 Moody's Rating cut Spain's rating by 2 notches to A1 from Aa2 with the outlook remaining negative. Standard and Poor's has downgraded Spain on 14 October 2011 and Fitch Ratings cut it to the same level on 7 October 2011. On 14 June 2012, Moody's downgraded Spain to Baa3, just one notch above "junk". Standard and Poor's downgraded Spain to BBB− (one notch above junk) on 11 October 2012. DBRS downgraded Spain to single-A, which remains higher than the major credit rating agencies. This rating allows the ECB to use a lower margin for banks that borrow with Spanish debt as collateral. After a recent review, Moody's maintained Spain's investment-grade credit rating, removing the pressure on the country's debt. This decision by Moody's assures that Spanish bonds will continue to gain investor support; yields feel 5.50%, a level last seen in April. Although Moody's can still downgrade the country's ratings in the future, the decision to not downgrade will encourage the buying of Spain's bonds.

2012 financial bailout

On 9 June 2012 the Eurogroup held an emergency meeting to discuss how to inject capital into Spanish banks. The IMF estimated the capital needs of the Spanish banks to be about 40 billion euros. The Eurogroup announced intentions to provide up to 100 billion euro to the Fund for Orderly Bank Restructuring to the Spanish government. The Spanish government is then expected to give the appropriate amount of money to the respective banks. On 21 June 2012 it was decided that 62 billion euros would be shared among the Spanish banks in need. The European Union warned that rescued banks are subject to control and Union experts would meet stringent requirements.
Since then, the country's borrowing costs have reached levels deemed unsustainable in the long run, raising the prospect of a second aid program for Madrid following the 100 billion euro lifeline it obtained for its banks in June. Spain expects the European Commission, to approve the restructuring plans of the banks needing aid on 15 November 2012 and then to authorize the disbursal of the first credit line of up to 100 billion euros within three weeks after that.

A larger economy than other countries which have received bailout packages, Spain had considerable bargaining power regarding the terms of a bailout. Due to reforms already instituted by Spain's conservative government less stringent austerity requirements are included then was the case with earlier bailout packages for Ireland, Portugal, and Greece.

As the EU's fifth largest economy, Spain remains a large concern. In 2011 Mariano Rajoy took over the government with his conservative views, pushing out José Luis Rodríguez Zapatero and his left-wing views.  Trying to get Spain out of the highest unemployment rate in the European Union was proven to be harder than expected. The bailout for Spain has been estimated to not be enough to restore the economy.  There is a serious debt in the country, and substantial cuts would have to be put in place to restore the economy at this point. Many youths are trying to find jobs abroad, creating a problem for the future domestic economy and job market.  Rajoy recently proposed a new budget for 2013 that would be very different and would cut government spending by 8.9%. By April 2013, unemployment had risen to 27%, but is now around 15% – 16.1% as of February 2018 and is one of Europe's fastest growing economies, thus demonstrating that the country is improving.

Separatist movements
One effect of the financial crisis is an increase in support for independence in Catalonia. The Statute of Autonomy included a package of laws that gave more power to the region and would have recognized Catalonia as a nation, although one still within Spain. As with the rest of Spain, Catalonia has had high levels of unemployment. As many as 22% of the economically active population, which is still lower than Spain's national jobless rate, yet higher than Madrid. In 2010, Spain's Constitutional Court weakened the Statute of Autonomy for Catalonia, which further irritated Catalan secessionist organization.

The 2015 regional election was the first to produce a majority for openly separatist parties. Prime Minister Mariano Rajoy insisted that Spain's constitution does not allow a region to secede. Spain's Basque Country unsuccessfully tried to get such a move approved in Parliament in 2008. Catalan president Artur Mas instead scheduled an independence referendum for 2014, which was downgraded to being a more informal ballot after further intervention by the Constitutional Court. The dispute remains unresolved, as of March 2015.

See also 
  2008–present Spanish society crisis
 2017 Spanish constitutional crisis
  Annex: Political corruption cases in Spain
 Catalan independentism
  Corruption in Spain
 Economy of Spain
 European sovereign debt crisis
 SAREB, bad bank set up to take over assets from the banks
 Spanish property bubble
 Unemployment in Spain
 Autonomous Liquidity Fund

References

External links 
 
 "Policy Alternatives for a Return to Full Employment in Spain" , the Center for Economic and Policy Research, November 2013

2008 in Spain
2009 in Spain
2010 in Spain
2011 in Spain
2012 in Spain
2013 in Spain
2014 in Spain
Spain
Spain
Spain
Spain
Spain
Spain
Spain
2000s in Spain
2010s in Spain
Economic history of Spain
Eurozone crisis
Spain
Stock market crashes
Financial crises